Nikunj Malik (born 30 October 1989) is an Indian actress and TV personality.

Career
Malik debuted as a contestant on the Indian reality wedding show, Rahul Dulhaniya le Jayega. The show first aired on NDTV Imagine on 1 February 2011. Although she was one of the most popular contestants, Malik opted out of marriage in the finale episode.

Malik made her film debut with the Bollywood film Revolver Rani alongside Kangana Ranaut. She also made a guest appearance in The Shaukeens.

Nikunj Malik is a graduate & post graduate from India's best fashion design college NIFT. She specialises in footwear designing. She also cleared IIM-A for doctorate but dropped out.

Malik has endorsed Indian spice brand, R-Pure, and thermal wear brand, Shera.

Television

Filmography
 Revolver Rani (Debut in 2014)
 The Shaukeens (Guest appearance)
 Meri Pyaari Bindu (Yashraj films)
 Gulmohar (un-released)

Controversy
She stirred controversy when her paternal relatives were arrested for allegedly harassing her mother and threatening to kill her family if she did not quit the entertainment industry. Malik claimed that her mother faced physical assault and death threats from her distant paternal relatives, who were already battling assault, rape, and murder charges in a domestic help case.

Personal life 
Nikunj's mother, Shubhalata Malik, is the Ex BJP Chief for the state of Delhi- Slum Cell BJP National executive member.

References

External links
 
 

Living people
Indian soap opera actresses
1985 births
Participants in Indian reality television series
People from Gurgaon
Actresses from Haryana
21st-century Indian actresses